Malcolm Todd (born 13 December 1941) is a South African archer. He competed in the men's individual event at the 1992 Summer Olympics.

References

External links
 

1941 births
Living people
South African male archers
Olympic archers of South Africa
Archers at the 1992 Summer Olympics
Place of birth missing (living people)